Alexander Arbuthnot (1538–1583) was a Scottish ecclesiastic poet, "an eminent divine, and zealous promoter of the Protestant Reformation in Scotland". He was Moderator of the General Assembly of the Church of Scotland (the highest position in the Church of Scotland) in both 1573 and 1577.

Family life
He was the third son of Andrew Arbuthnot of Pitcarles, who in turn was the fourth son of Sir Robert Arbuthnot of Arbuthnot. His mother was Elizabeth Strachan, daughter of James Strachan of Monboddo.

Career
After having studied languages and philosophy at the University of Aberdeen, and civil law under the noted Jacques Cujas at the University of Bourges in France, Arbuthnot took ecclesiastical orders, and became in his own country a zealous supporter of the Reformation.

In 1569 he was elected principal of King's College, Aberdeen, an office he retained until his death. He played an active part in the church politics of the period, and was twice Moderator of the General Assembly of the Church of Scotland, and a member of the commission of inquiry into the condition the University of St Andrews (1583).

His attitude on public questions earned him the condemnation of Catholic writers. He is not included in Nicol Burne's list of periurit apostatis, but his policy and influence were disliked by James VI, who, when the Assembly had elected Arbuthnot to the charge of the kirk of St. Andrews, ordered him to return to his duties at King's College.

Minister of Logie Buchan (1568), of Forve and Arbuthnott (1569) Old Machar (1574) and of St Andrews (1583). Moderator of the General Assembly (1573 and 1577). He matriculated his arms. 

He died on 10 October 1583 and is buried in the Kirk of St Nicholas in central Aberdeen just in front of the pulpit.

Works
His extant poetical works are three poems, The Praises of Wemen (4 lines), On Luve (10 lines), and The Miseries of a Pure (poor) Scholar (189 lines).  The praise of women in the first poem is exceptional in the literature of his age; and its geniality helps us to understand the author's popularity with his contemporaries.

He wrote a volume entitled 'Orations on the Origins and Dignity of the Law', Orationes de origine et dignitate juris, 4to. (Edinburgh, 1572).

He also wrote a Latin account of the history of the Arbuthnott family, Originis et Incrementi Arbuthnoticae Familiae Descriptio Historica, held in Aberdeen University Library in a volume containing a contemporary translation into Scots by William Morrison. An English continuation of the Arbuthnott history, by Dr John Arbuthnot, is preserved in the Advocates Library, Edinburgh.

Notes

References
 
 The Scottish Studies Foundation, brief bio

Further reading

External links

1538 births
1583 deaths
Alexander Arbuthnot
Moderators of the General Assembly of the Church of Scotland
16th-century Scottish clergy
16th-century Scottish poets
Scottish Christian theologians
Alumni of the University of Aberdeen
Principals of the University of Aberdeen
Academics of the University of Aberdeen
University of Bourges
People associated with the University of St Andrews
16th-century Protestant religious leaders
16th-century Scottish historians
16th-century male writers